The term super statute was applied in 2001 by William Eskridge and John Ferejohn to characterize an ordinary statute whose effort "to establish a new normative or institutional framework ... 'stick[s]' in the public culture" and has "a broad effect on the law". As a result, it has a "quasi-constitutional" significance that exceeds its formal status as a statute.

Other uses
According to Eskridge and Ferejohn, previous legal commentators had used the term "super-statute" for other purposes. Some writers have used the term to describe a constitution, e.g., A. E. Dick Howard, The Road from Runnymede: Magna Carta and the Constitutionalism in America (1968, pg.122) (stating that American lawyers in the eighteenth century viewed Magna Carta and the common law it was thought to embody "as a kind of superstatute, a constitution placing fundamental liberties beyond the reach of Parliament"). Other writers believe it's simply a big statute with no force outside its four corners, e.g., Bruce A. Ackerman, "Constitutional Politics/Constitutional Law", 99 Yale Law Journal 453, 522 (1989) ("Superstatutes do not seek to revise any of the deeper principles organizing our higher law; instead, they content themselves with changing one or more rules without challenging basic premises.").

References

Statutory law